is a Japanese footballer currently playing as a defender for Thespakusatsu Gunma.

Career statistics

Club
.

Notes

References

External links

1998 births
Living people
Hosei University alumni
Japanese footballers
Association football defenders
J2 League players
Thespakusatsu Gunma players